is a Japanese footballer who currently plays for Tochigi Uva F.C. in the Kantō Soccer League.

Club statistics
Updated to 23 February 2016.

References

External links

1986 births
Living people
Association football people from Saitama Prefecture
Japanese footballers
J2 League players
J3 League players
Japan Football League players
Mito HollyHock players
Tochigi City FC players
V-Varen Nagasaki players
Zweigen Kanazawa players
Association football goalkeepers